The 1904 Cumberland Bulldogs football team represented Cumberland University in the 1904 Southern Intercollegiate Athletic Association football season. The team was a member of the Southern Intercollegiate Athletic Association (SIAA), compiling a 3–1 record.

Schedule

References

Cumberland
Cumberland Phoenix football seasons
Cumberland Bulldogs football